Galatea is a settlement in the Whakatāne District in the Bay of Plenty region of the North Island of New Zealand.

The forested hills and mountains of the Ikawhenua Range and in particular Mount Tāwhiuau stand guard on the eastern flank of the Galatea Plains or Basin, an area surrounding the village.

Demographics
The SA1 area is part of the Galatea statistical area.

The SA1 area had a population of 153 at the 2018 New Zealand census, an increase of 6 people (4.1%) since the 2013 census, and an increase of 12 people (8.5%) since the 2006 census. There were 60 households, comprising 78 males and 78 females, giving a sex ratio of 1.0 males per female. The median age was 36.8 years (compared with 37.4 years nationally), with 36 people (23.5%) aged under 15 years, 24 (15.7%) aged 15 to 29, 72 (47.1%) aged 30 to 64, and 18 (11.8%) aged 65 or older.

Ethnicities were 90.2% European/Pākehā, 17.6% Māori, 2.0% Asian, and 2.0% other ethnicities. People may identify with more than one ethnicity.

Although some people chose not to answer the census's question about religious affiliation, 56.9% had no religion, and 35.3% were Christian.

Of those at least 15 years old, 6 (5.1%) people had a bachelor's or higher degree, and 33 (28.2%) people had no formal qualifications. The median income was $41,000, compared with $31,800 nationally. 9 people (7.7%) earned over $70,000 compared to 17.2% nationally. The employment status of those at least 15 was that 72 (61.5%) people were employed full-time, 18 (15.4%) were part-time, and 6 (5.1%) were unemployed.

Galatea statistical area
Galatea statistical area includes Minginui, and surrounds but does not include Murupara.

Galatea statistical area had a population of 1,407 at the 2018 New Zealand census, an increase of 87 people (6.6%) since the 2013 census, and a decrease of 24 people (−1.7%) since the 2006 census. There were 498 households, comprising 714 males and 693 females, giving a sex ratio of 1.03 males per female. The median age was 34.0 years (compared with 37.4 years nationally), with 378 people (26.9%) aged under 15 years, 264 (18.8%) aged 15 to 29, 624 (44.3%) aged 30 to 64, and 141 (10.0%) aged 65 or older.

Ethnicities were 53.3% European/Pākehā, 60.1% Māori, 3.6% Pacific peoples, 1.1% Asian, and 0.9% other ethnicities. People may identify with more than one ethnicity.

The percentage of people born overseas was 4.9, compared with 27.1% nationally.

Although some people chose not to answer the census's question about religious affiliation, 43.5% had no religion, 30.7% were Christian, 17.9% had Māori religious beliefs and 0.2% had other religions.

Of those at least 15 years old, 114 (11.1%) people had a bachelor's or higher degree, and 303 (29.4%) people had no formal qualifications. The median income was $24,400, compared with $31,800 nationally. 108 people (10.5%) earned over $70,000 compared to 17.2% nationally. The employment status of those at least 15 was that 459 (44.6%) people were employed full-time, 171 (16.6%) were part-time, and 87 (8.5%) were unemployed.

Geography
The southern boundary of the Galatea Plains is the Whirinaki River, which descends from Te Urewera and joins the Rangitāiki River below the township of Murupara. A few miles downstream on the western side of this trout-filled river, Fort Galatea was built, where from their lofty lookout the constables living there were able to survey the tracks used by the many Māori who passed by on their way from or to the coast near Whakatāne.

To the north the Ikawhenuas lower and gradually close in to reach the right hand bank of the Rangitāiki River, leaving only enough room for an access road from the valley over "Snake Hill" to the Rangitāiki Plains.

History

Pre-European history
The coastal area of the Bay of Plenty has been occupied by various tribes of Māori arriving in canoes from the islands of Polynesia. As more canoes arrived, the newcomers either fitted in with the peaceful residents or overcame them. They fished when the season was right, then moved inland to trap pigeons, gather fernroots, and catch eels. At these times they reached Waiōhau, Galatea, Murupara and Te Whāiti.

19th century
When visits of European trading ships became more common, the Galatea Māori would travel down the river with goods to barter. Flax was their main commodity and axes, spades, hoes and later, guns and clothing were given in return. These people were Ngāti Manawa and their neighbours in the adjoining Urewera forested hills were the Ngāi Tūhoe, or "Children of the Mist", who often raided the Ngāti Manawa and on occasion drove them out of the area.

Pōmare, chief of the Ngāpuhi from Northland was in the habit of travelling south to fight with the Bay of Plenty tribes and after attacking all the pā on the plains, chased the Tūhoe back into the Urewera hills. He returned home with his canoes loaded with spoils and heads of the vanquished, only to return a year later The Ngāti Manawa were relieved to see the Ngāpuhi disappear up the Horomanga River to meet up with Pōmare's party who travelled up the Waimana River into the mountainous Urewera lands.

A principal chief of Tūhoe sent a messenger to Pōmare asking for a meeting at which the threat of war between the tribes ceased and this led to continuing peace between Ngāpuhi and Tūhoe.

The Pai Mārire religion started in Taranaki and was introduced to the Bay of Plenty in 1865 by two of its prophets who met the Tūhoe, Ngāti Manawa and Ngāti Whare tribes with the object of explaining the "new religion". Some accepted and were initiated around the head of Captain P.W.J. Lloyd who had been killed in Taranaki. In Ōpōtiki, the Rev. Carl Völkner, a much loved missionary was murdered by Hauhau, and later a half-caste interpreter, James Fulloon was murdered at Whakatāne. Open hostility to "pākehā" was shown over a wide area, and killings occurred on both sides.

This is where Fort Galatea came into use. HMS Galatea at that time was visiting the country under the command of Prince Alfred, Duke of Edinburgh. and it is from this ship that the name was derived. Soldiers were stationed at the Fort in readiness to march into the Urewera forests to fight the Hauhau, and with them a renegade by the name of Te Kooti who had been captured after a battle in the Poverty Bay area. He was transported as a prisoner to the Chatham Islands when he soon became the leader of the prisoners. During a riot, they escaped, seized a schooner and reached the mainland where they continued the war against the pākehā. Te Kooti was ruthless and in complete control of the Hauhau, even though he was not one of them, but was a prophet and leader of what was to become the Ringatū religion.

Education

The school opened in 1935.

References

Whakatane District
Populated places in the Bay of Plenty Region